Angus & Coote is an Australian jewellery chain founded in Sydney in 1895 and listed on the ASX in 1952. The retailer claims to be a leader in Australia for high quality jewellery, with its 300 stores having a 20% market share as of early 2007.

In March 2007, James Pascoe Group (JPG) completed a $A76m ($NZ87m) takeover bid for the Angus & Coote chain, including brands Amies in Queensland, Dunklings in Victoria and Edments in South Australia and Western Australia (all completely rebranded to Angus & Coote after November 2008) and Goldmark. The Goldmark and Edments brands were part of Prouds The Jewellers, with Angus & Coote acquiring them in 1996 when JPG purchased the main Prouds brand. At the time of the purchase, David Norman suggested one or more of newly acquired Angus & Coote brands could be launched in New Zealand. Goldmark is now included as a store-within-a-store at kiosks in selected Farmer stores.

The original owners of Angus & Coote, the Coote family, had owned the business for several years and became one of the grandest and most elite families in Australia. The founder, Edmund James Coote, passed the business down to his son Roy Rundle Coote. The business became extremely well-known and made it through international names. The last owner was Antony Edmund Rundle Coote, who expanded the business throughout the 70s and sold for 11million dollars a year. They sold the business for 77 million dollars and the Coote family still runs.

References

External links

 

Jewellery companies of Australia
Jewellery retailers of Australia
Companies based in Sydney
Retail companies established in 1895
Australian companies established in 1895
Companies formerly listed on the Australian Securities Exchange
Australian brands